Lucien Vidie (1805, Nantes – April 1866, Nantes) was a French physicist. In 1844 he invented the barograph, that is, a device to monitor pressure, a recording aneroid barometer.

Passionate about his work, Vidi spent all his wealth to fund his research on the barograph. The invention proved successful, and Vidi managed to make profit of it, despite several legal battles. In particular, Mr. Bourdon, who in 1849 designed a similar barometer, filed a suit in 1852, which Vidi won by late 1858.

Vidie's death was ascribed to his excessive use of hydrotherapy.

References 

French physicists
1805 births
1866 deaths